David "Dave" William Plummer (born August 9, 1968) is a Canadian-American programmer and entrepreneur.  He created the Task Manager for Windows, the Space Cadet Pinball ports to Windows NT, Zip file support for Windows, HyperCache for the Amiga and many other software products. He has been issued six patents in the software engineering space. He holds the world record score for the video game Tempest. He is also known for his YouTube channel, Dave's Garage.

Personal life
Plummer was born and raised in Regina, Saskatchewan, Canada. As a child, Plummer spent much of his free time at his father's hardware store and his grandfather's workshop. When he was 11, he had his first interaction with a computer at a local RadioShack; he helped them set up their newly arrived computer even though he had no previous experience.

Plummer discovered that the University of Regina had a computer lab that he could access on Saturday mornings. He began going there every week to use and explore their computers. Shortly after, his mother enrolled him in a computer class at the University of Regina that was offered to the community.

He attended Miller High School, but dropped out during his senior year. As a teenager, he created several video games for the Commodore 64, including Tour de Force. After working various jobs and programming a computer game with a friend, he returned to high school at the age of 21 and graduated. He then enrolled in the University of Regina and graduated in 1994 with a Bachelor's of Science with High Honors Computer Science.

As of 2021, Plummer lives with his wife Nicole and their four children, ages 14, 15, 21 and 22, in Sammamish, Washington.

Plummer revealed in a 2021 YouTube video that he is autistic, and has Attention Deficit Disorder. He also wrote a book about his experiences with autism and how it has impacted his life, titled Secrets of the Autistic Millionaire: Everything I know about Autism, ASD, and Asperger's that I wish I'd known back then.

Career
After landing an intensive interview with Microsoft, Plummer moved to Redmond, Washington, and began working for the tech company in 1993. He began his career with Microsoft as an intern in the MS-DOS department, working for Ben Slivka, but was later offered a full-time job with the company for $35,000 a year.

Plummer said in a 2021 interview: "As intern I wrote a bunch of major features, like Smart Drive cache for CD-ROM, and DISKCOPY".

While employed at Microsoft, Plummer began creating the Task Manager program at his home. Plummer eventually showed his newly developed program to Dave Cutler, who allowed him to bring his project into work, upload it to the system, and fine tune the program into what was eventually released with the 1996 shipments of Microsoft computers. During his tenure with Microsoft, Plummer worked on software such as MS-DOS 6.2 and Windows NT, including notable features like Task Manager and Space Cadet Pinball.

Plummer left Microsoft in 2003 to start his own company, SoftwareOnline LLC, which went on to sell millions of copies of first and third party utilities software for Windows.  

In 2006, Plummer's SoftwareOnline.com company was sued by The Washington State Attorney General’s Office for alleged violations of the Consumer Protection Act after complaints were made about two products called "Registry Cleaner" and "InternetShield". SoftwareOnline.com agreed to pay $150,000 in civil penalties, plus $250,000 that was ultimately suspended following compliance with all terms in the settlement, as well as $40,000 in legal fees. In December 2009, Xeriton Corporation was sold to Support.com for $8.5 million.

He continues to code in his free time. Additionally, he started his own YouTube channel, called Dave's Garage, where he creates a variety of content regarding computer programming and his personal interest, cars.

After nearly 25 years of anonymity, on May 25, 2020, Plummer came forward in a Reddit post, and admitted to developing the Task Manager application. In the post, he also shared some tips and tricks for using Task Manager.

Exactly six months later, on November 25, 2020, Plummer came forward again with a YouTube video that described his role in selecting the ballast data for the Windows XP anti-piracy protection.  Plummer claims to have used the digital images of Microsoft Bob as the initial seed into the pseudorandom number generation that produced the ballast, so that (in his words) the "Digital spirit of Bob" was included with approximately 500,000,000 Windows XP installations.

Plummer has given lectures at universities such as the University of Regina (2018, 2020, 2022) and the University of Oxford (2021).

References

External links

David Plummer on GitHub

1968 births
Living people
American computer programmers
Canadian computer programmers
Canadian emigrants to the United States
Canadian YouTubers
DOS people
People from Regina, Saskatchewan
Microsoft Windows people
People on the autism spectrum